Merry-Go-Round is a 1956 Hungarian drama film directed by Zoltán Fábri, based on the short story Kútban (In the Well) by Imre Sarkadi. It was in competition at the 1956 Cannes Film Festival. It was later selected to be screened in the Cannes Classics section of the 2017 Cannes Film Festival. The film was chosen to be part both of Budapest Twelve, a list of Hungarian films considered the best in 1968 and its follow-up, the New Budapest Twelve in 2000.

Plot
The story takes place in a rural area of Hungary. There are two young people who fall in love with each other. However, the girl's father wants her to marry someone else.  But surprisingly this classic love story intertwines with traditional, political and economic choices.

The scene where the two lovers are spinning at a dizzying view on the carousel has taken its place in the history of cinema. What makes the scene impressive is that the camera spinned with them.

Cast
 Mari Törőcsik as Pataki Mari
 Imre Soós as Bíró Máté
 Ádám Szirtes as Farkas Sándor
 Béla Barsi as Pataki István
 Manyi Kiss as Patakiné
 Gyula Bakos
 Antal Farkas as Samu János
 József Juhász
 Flóra Kádár as Eszti
 Ervin Kibédi
 Mária Kovács (as C. Kovács Mária)
 László Kozák
 János Makláry as Elszámoltatóbizottság tagja
 László Misoga as Sógor
 Piri Peéry

Bibliography
 Merry-Go-Round / Körhinta (1956), Review, 12 July 2011, Bonjourtristesse

References

External links

1956 films
1956 drama films
Hungarian drama films
1950s Hungarian-language films
Hungarian black-and-white films
Films directed by Zoltán Fábri